, released in the United Kingdom as Screams of Blasphemy, is a 1991 Japanese cyberpunk horror film directed by Shozin Fukui. It deals with the theme of brain-modified sex slaves as well as mental breakdowns in a hallucinogenic thrill ride.

Plot
964 Pinocchio is a memory-wiped sex slave cyborg who is thrown out by his owners for failure to maintain an erection. It is unclear in what ways he has been modified beyond having no memory and being unable to communicate. He is discovered by Himiko, a homeless girl, while wandering aimlessly through the city. Himiko has also been memory-wiped, possibly by the same company that produced Pinocchio, but she is fully functional. Himiko spends her days drawing maps of the city, to aid other memory-wiped people.

Himiko takes Pinocchio home and tries to teach him to speak. After much effort he has a breakthrough and finally becomes aware of his situation. At this point his body erupts in an inexplicable metamorphosis and it becomes clear that his modifications were much more involved and esoteric than simple memory loss. Himiko also begins to transform, though in a much more subtle manner.

Release
Unearthed Films released the film on DVD in the United States in 2007.  The film was released in a single edition DVD and in the Cyberpunk Collection alongside Fukui's Rubber's Lover. Both releases are currently out of print.

References

External links
 
 
 964 Pinocchio at Horrordrome
 

1991 films
1991 horror films
1991 science fiction films
1990s science fiction horror films
Cyberpunk films
Cyborg films
Films directed by Shozin Fukui
Films set in the future
Films shot in Tokyo
1990s Japanese-language films
Japanese science fiction horror films
1990s Japanese films